Kirmes may refer to:

Kirmes (also known as Kirchweih), festival dedicated to church's patron saint or the founding of local church in German-speaking countries
Kirmess or Kermesse, similar term in Dutch language
The Fair (German: Kirmes), 1960 West German drama film
Oskar Kirmes (born 1995), Finnish artistic gymnast